Barnes Peak is a peak,  high, standing  southeast of Mount Dickerson in the Queen Alexandra Range. It was named by the Advisory Committee on Antarctic Names for Elwood E. Barnes, a United States Antarctic Research Program cosmic rays scientist at Hallett Station, 1963.

References 

Mountains of the Ross Dependency
Shackleton Coast